Arthur Welsh may refer to:

Arthur L. Welsh (1881–1912), American aviator
Arthur Welshe (fl. 1560s), MP for Morpeth
Arthur Welche or Welsh (fl. 1550s), MP for Dunheved

See also
George Arthur Welsh (1896–1965), Canadian flying ace, farmer and political figure
Arthur Walsh (disambiguation)